Classen School of Advanced Studies, often referred to as Classen SAS, CSAS or simply Classen, is a public speciality school serving students in grades 9–12 in Oklahoma City, Oklahoma. The Oklahoma City Public Schools program participates in the IB Diploma Programme and offers fine arts courses as well, offering art, drama, and music classes to any qualifying student.

Classen is known as one of the state's premier high schools in academics, and has been ranked among the top 100 public high schools in America by the Challenge Index, as measured by the number of Advanced Placement, International Baccalaureate and/or Cambridge tests taken by all students at a school in 2007 divided by the number of graduating seniors. The index is published annually in the Washington Post and Newsweek. It was ranked 14 in 2009.

As Classen High School, the basketball team won state championships in 1929, 1934, 1937, 1948, 1950, 1975, and in 1980. In 1995, Classen SAS won the Class B State Championship in Academic Quiz Bowl and in 1996, Classen SAS was the Class 3A State Runner-Up in Academic Quiz Bowl. It is currently a Division 4A school.

History
Classen Junior High School opened in 1919, immediately following the close of World War I, making it the oldest high school building in Oklahoma City Public Schools. The land was part of an area being developed by the early Oklahoma City real estate developer, Anton H. Classen. A total of 6.33 acres was purchased by the Oklahoma City Public Schools Board of Education for $55,100. The building was constructed at a cost of $420,500 by the Holmboe Construction Company.

The two story brick building was enlarged in 1921, 1923, 1925, 1934 and 1957. In 1925, Classen opened its doors to high school students and changed its name to Classen High School. Due to declining enrollment, Classen High School closed in 1985 and the building became a 5th-year center. In 1994, the Classen School of Advanced Studies opened with an enrollment size of 647, covering grades 6-10. Its first graduating class was graduated in May 1997.  Josie Cao and Minh Truong were both the first valedictorians of Classen SAS and Jonathon Lunardi was selected as the student of the year in 1997.

Northeast High School
Northeast High School was a public high school in Oklahoma City, Oklahoma. It was merged with and subsumed into Classen School of Advanced Studies which took over its building. The school's student body was predominantly African American.

Extracurricular activities
Classen SAS fields teams in OSSAA-sanctioned competition in basketball, swim,  baseball, football, softball, golf, dance team, cross country, soccer, tennis and volleyball. Track is offered cooperatively with U. S. Grant High School;

Clubs and organizations at the school include Ambassador Corp, Asian Club, Builders Club, Black Student Union, Cheerleaders, Earth Club, French Club, German American Partnership Program (GAPP), German Club, Key Club, Latino Club, Mu Alpha Theta, National Art Honor Society, National Honor Society, Native American Club, Orchestra, Pep Band, Science Club, Spanish Club, Student Council, Thespian Society,  Visual Arts Club, UFO, Young Democrats, Latin Club, Classen Choral Society, Band Boosters (band council), Gay Straight Alliance, Fireballs (pep club), Mock Trial, Bike Club, Culinary, E Sports, and Young Libertarian.

Notable alumni

Classen High School

Jerrie Cobb, aircraft pilot and member of the Mercury 13.
Wayne Coyne, guitarist, lead singer, and songwriter of rock band The Flaming Lips
Admiral William J. Crowe, Chairman of the Joint Chiefs of Staff, 1985–1989.
Jimmy Edwards, Professional football player
Edith Kinney Gaylord, Journalist, Founder of Inasmuch Foundation and Ethics and Excellence in Journalism Foundation.
David Hall, former Governor of Oklahoma
Van Heflin, actor
Henry Iba, prolific former basketball coach, and coach at Classen High School and later at Oklahoma State University
Patience Latting, first woman to serve as Mayor of Oklahoma City, first female mayor of a major American city.  
Cleta Mitchell, conservative lawyer, former Democratic legislator.
James H. Norick, former mayor of Oklahoma City
Dale Robertson, movie and television actor
Claude Weaver III, World War II ace

References

External links

Educational institutions established in 1994
Public high schools in Oklahoma
International Baccalaureate schools in Oklahoma
Public middle schools in Oklahoma
Schools in Oklahoma City
Magnet schools in Oklahoma
1994 establishments in Oklahoma